Elviro Blanc (born 8 January 1945) is an Italian cross-country skier. He competed at the 1968 Winter Olympics and the 1972 Winter Olympics.

References

External links
 

1945 births
Living people
Italian male cross-country skiers
Olympic cross-country skiers of Italy
Cross-country skiers at the 1968 Winter Olympics
Cross-country skiers at the 1972 Winter Olympics
Sportspeople from Aosta Valley